The XI Corps or Peshawar Corps is a corps of Pakistan Army. The XI Corps is the only one corps that is assigned in the Khyber-Pakhtunkhwa (KPK) province of Pakistan. It is currently stationed in Peshawar, Khyber-Pakhtaunkhuwa. The Corps was established and quickly raised in 1975 to support administrative military operational units in the NWFP and Northern Areas. The corps is internationally distinguished for its involvement in Soviet–Afghan War.

Afghan War 
The start of the Afghan War brought the Corps to prominence. It was given three infantry divisions as well has been given the responsibility of covering the Khyber Pass, one of the two approaches by which the Soviets could attack into Pakistan (the other was the Bolan Pass, guarded by the XII Corps). For more than a decade it held the line against Soviet expansionism.

Kargil War 
The end of the Cold War  affected the Corp immensely. No longer facing a threat on its western flank, the army moved  brigades and units away from the XIcorps, with its  orientation being changed from a defending the Afghan border, to being a reserve force in Kashmir. The 1999 Kargil War saw the corps enter direct action for the first time and it fought mainly in the Gultari sector of Kashmir, where one of its members, Captain Kernel Sher Khan would be posthumously awarded the highest Pakistani military award Nishan-e-Haider,  after being martyred in combat.

War on Terror 
After September 11 attacks in the United States in 2001 and the subsequent invasion of Afghanistan, the XI Corps became the main Pakistani formation involved in fighting in Waziristan and the North West Frontier in general. It has been reinforced and also commands substantial forces of paramilitary Frontier Corps.

Structure 
The order of battle of the corps keeps changing, especially in view of its current commitment in the War on terror. During peacetime the XI corps is based in the following areas:

The formations composition has changed on several occasions in the past, and like all formations on the western border it has received reinforcements for the war on terror, however its present composition is thought to be.

List of Commanders XI Corps

References

 Brain Cloughley, A History of Pakistan Army
 Colonel Kaiser Hameed Khan who served in this HQ twice, as a capt during 1983 to 1986 and as Lt Col during 1996 to 1999.

External links 
 GlobalSecurity.org, Global Security Website about the XI Corps
 This shows the Formations Insignia
 Daily Times - Lt Gen Asif Yasin Malik Takes Over As Peshawar Corps Commander 

Corps of the Pakistan Army
Military units and formations established in 1975
1975 establishments in Pakistan